English rock band Sea Power, previously known as British Sea Power, have released 10 studio albums, 4 soundtrack albums, 6 extended plays, 58 compilation appearances, 27 singles, 12 music videos and 4 miscellaneous

British Sea Power released their debut album The Decline of British Sea Power on 2 June 2003. In the UK it reached 54 in the peak chart position and earned a silver certification. The Decline of British Sea Power released 4 singles; "Fear of Drowning", "Remember Me", "The Lonely", "Carrion/Apologies to Insect Life".

The band's second studio album Open Season on 4 April 2005. In the UK it reached 13 in the peak chart position and earned a silver certification. Its lead single "It Ended On an Oily Stage" reached 18 in the UK charts and NME naming it Track of the Week, while "Please Stand Up" reached 34 in the UK charts and received positive reviews for the music video.

The third studio album Do You Like Rock Music? was released on 14 January 2008. It reached 10 in the UK, 5 in the US and 97 in the Netherlands in its peak chart positions. Its lead single "No Lucifer" was unable to make in the charts, while "Waving Flags" reached 31 on the UK charts.

Their fourth soundtrack/studio album Man of Aran was released on 18 May 2009 accompanying the 1934 movie of the same title. It has released titular song "Man of Aran" and another similar track called "Woman of Aran".

British Sea Power's fifth studio album Valhalla Dancehall was released on 10 January 2011. It has reached 22 in the UK and 14 in the US peak chart positions. It has lead single "Living Is So Easy" which was also released digitally, "Who's In Control", "Georgie Ray" which was inspired by George Orwell and Ray Bradbury, "Cleaning Out the Rooms" was released on the album and Zeus, same with "Mongk II" entitled "Mongk".

A sixth studio album Machineries of Joy was released on 1 April 2013. It reached on the UK album chart and 19 on the regular chart. It has 4 singles including its titular lead single "Machineries of Joy", "Loving Animals", "Monsters of Sunderland" and "Facts Are Right".

From the Sea to the Land Beyond, seventh soundtrack/studio album, was released for the movie of the same title on 2 December 2013. It was performed by the band for their love of nature and wildlife and plays the titular song during some part in the film. It has also done some reworks of previous tracks such as "Carrion", "No Lucifer" and "The Great Skua" all with new material.

Their eighth soundtrack/studio album Sea of Brass was released on 30 October 2015. It features songs from previous albums and was released as an expanded edition, a deluxe boxset and a DVD. They performed most of the songs with Brass Bands across the UK.

Studio album nine, Let the Dancers Inherit the Party was released on 31 March 2017. It includes singles "Bad Bohemian", "Keep on Trying (Sechs Freunde)" and "Electrical Kittens". They also released a four-disc box set with bonus discs of demos, alternative versions and instrumentals. The deluxe two-disc version has an extended version of "Saint Jerome" with a length of 5:35.

Studio albums

Soundtrack albums

Extended plays

 Remember Me (2003)
 The Spirit of St. Louis (2004)
 Krankenhaus? (2007)
 Zeus (2010)
 Valhalla V.I.P. (2011)
 BSP 1-6 (2012)

Singles

Videos

 Remember Me
 Carrion/Apologies to Insect Life (VHS, Promo, PAL)
 It Ended On an Oily Stage
 Please Stand Up (VHS, PAL)
 Waving Flags
 No Lucifer
 Living Is So Easy
 Who's In Control
 Machineries of Joy
 From the Sea to the Land Beyond
 Bad Bohemian
 Keep on Trying (Sechs Freunde)
 Don't Let The Sun Get In The Way
 Two Fingers
 Folly
 Lakeland Echo

Miscellaneous

 Trans-Manche Advance Portion (CDr, Sampler)
 "Close the Door" (File, MP3, 160)
 "Carrion/All In It (Remix)" (File, MP3, 128)
 Postcards From A Young Man Tour Sampler (CD, Promo, Sampler)

References

External links

 – official site

 at Last.FM
British Sea Power on Myspace

British Sea Power 
Musical groups from Brighton and Hove
Musical groups established in 2000